Lac Terant is a small lake in the Côte-Nord region of the province of Quebec, Canada. It drains to the west into Lake Sainte-Anne.

Location

Lac Terant is in the unorganized territory of Lac-Walker in the Sept-Rivières Regional County Municipality and Côte-Nord region of Quebec.
The lake's name was made official on 20 June 1989. Its origin is not known.
This lake, Lac Godebeuf, in turn drains to the west into the Toulnustouc River, which at this point forms the northern arm of Lake Sainte-Anne.

Environment

A map of the ecological regions of Quebec shows this part of Lake Sainte-Anne and its surroundings is in ecological subregion 6j-S (Hautes collines des lacs Nipissis et Magpie) of the eastern spruce/moss domain of the boreal zone.
A map published in 2018 by Sépac of hunting area 17B of the Port-Cartier–Sept-Îles Wildlife Reserve shows the lake just within the southwest corner of the area.
According to the map, the land around the lake is forested with timber over thirty years old.
Some of the land just downstream towards Lac Godebeuf is regenerating, with trees aged 10 to 30 years.

References

Sources

Lakes of Côte-Nord